In organosulfur chemistry, a sulfenyl chloride is a functional group with the connectivity , where R is alkyl or aryl. According to IUPAC nomenclature they are named as alkyl thiohypochlorites, i.e. esters of thiohypochlorous acid.

Preparation

Sulfenyl chlorides are typically prepared by chlorination of disulfides:

R2S2 + Cl2 -> 2 R-SCl

This reaction is sometimes called the Zincke disulfide reaction, in recognition of Theodor Zincke. Typically, sulfenyl halides are stabilized by electronegative substituents.  This trend is illustrated by the stability of  obtained by chlorination of carbon disulfide.

Some thioethers with electron-withdrawing substituents undergo chlorinolysis of a  bond to afford the sulfenyl chloride.

Reactions
Perchloromethyl mercaptan reacts with  bonds in the presence of base to give the sulfenamides:
CCl3SCl + R2NH -> CCl3SNR2 + HCl
This method is used in the production of the fungicides Captan and Folpet.

Sulfenyl chlorides add across alkenes, for example ethylene:
CH2=CH2 + R-SCl -> R-SC2H4Cl

They undergo chlorination to the trichlorides:
R-SCl + Cl2 -> [R-SCl2]Cl

Sulfenyl chlorides react with water and alcohols to give sulfenyl esters:
R-SCl + H2O -> R-SOH + HCl
R-SCl + R'-OH -> R-SO-R' + HCl

Route to sulfinyl halides
Sulfenyl chlorides can be converted to sulfinyl chlorides (RS(O)Cl).  In one approach, the sulfinyl chloride is generated in two steps starting with reaction of a thiol with sulfuryl chloride.  In some cases the sulfenyl chloride results instead, as happens with 2,2,2-trifluoro-1,1-diphenylethanethiol.  A trifluoroperacetic acid oxidation then provides a general approach to formation of sulfinyl chlorides from sulfenyl chlorides:

Related compounds
Sulfenyl fluorides and bromides are also known.  Simple sulfenyl iodides are unknown because they are unstable with respect to the disulfide and iodine:
2 R-SI -> (R-S)2 + I2
Sulfenyl iodides can be isolated as stable compounds if they bear alkyl steric protecting groups as part of a cavity-shaped framework, illustrating the technique of kinetic stabilization of a reactive functionality, as in the case of sulfenic acids.

A related class of compounds are the alkylsulfur trichlorides, as exemplified by methylsulfur trichloride, .

The corresponding selenenyl halides, are more commonly encountered in the laboratory. Sulfenyl chlorides are used in the production of agents used in the vulcanization of rubber.

References

Organosulfur compounds
Functional groups